Cataract Lake may refer to:

 Cagles Mill Lake, Indiana, United States
 Cataract Lake (Arizona), United States
 Lake Cataract, near Cataract Dam, New South Wales, Australia